The Employees' Provident Fund, abbreviated to EPF, is a social security scheme of employees in Sri Lanka under the Central Bank of Sri Lanka. It was established under Act No. 15 of 1958 by S. W. R. D. Bandaranaike, and as of December 2010, it had Rs 899.6  billion, which is equivalent to 16% of the GDP. The EPF offers a joint action plan by the employer and the employee to save money by targeting retirement and future to the government as well as the private sector. EPF invests in most  Sri Lankan private companies such as Vallible One and Commercial Bank of Ceylon.

See also
Employees' Trust Fund

References

External links 
Website of EPF

Age pension systems
Retirement in Sri Lanka
Social security in Sri Lanka
Public pension funds